Hypolimnas pandarus is a butterfly in the family Nymphalidae. The species was first described by Carl Linnaeus in his 1758 10th edition of Systema Naturae.

Distribution
This species is present in the Indonesia (Ambon Island, Serang, Saparua, Buru, Kai Islands).

Subspecies
Subspecies include:
Hypolimnas pandarus pandarus (Ambon Island, Serang, Saparua)
Hypolimnas pandarus pandora (Wallace, 1869) (Buru)
Hypolimnas pandarus hewitsoni Wallace, 1869 (Kai Islands)

Description
In males, the forewings are dark brown, usually with a few white, yellow or blue spots, depending on the subspecies, while the female has a band across the upper wings either creamy white or pale rufous. The posterior margin of the hindwings is deeply scalloped and shows a broad rufous-orange band, with several brown or black oval spots. In some subspecies is also present a pink purple patch.

References

External links
 Insecta.pro

pandarus